Ptocheuusa inopella is a moth of the family Gelechiidae. It is found from France to Russia and from Denmark and Sweden to Austria and Hungary. It has also been recorded from Greece.

The wingspan is 8–9 mm. Adults are on wing from June and July to the beginning of August.

The larvae feed on Helichrysum arenarium species (including Helichrysum arenarium) and Inula dysenterica. They feed on the flowers of their host plant. Larvae can be found in August.

References

Moths described in 1839
Ptocheuusa
Moths of Europe